Evan John Jones (1936–2003) was an English traditional witch, occultist and writer who operated within the tradition of Cochrane's Craft.

Early life
An engineer, he served in the Army as a young man and saw active duty as a paratrooper in the Suez crisis of 1956 and fighting communist insurgents in Malaya.

Career
Following Robert Cochrane's death in 1966, he served as the second Magister of the Clan of Tubal Cain from 1966 to 1998.

Publications
During his lifetime, he authored two books on the subject of the Craft, Witchcraft: A Tradition Renewed (1990) and Sacred Mask, Sacred Dance (1996), the latter co-written with American Pagan studies scholar Chas S. Clifton.

See also
 Wicca
 Robert Cochrane (witch)

References

Bibliography

External links
Interview in The Cauldron, 2003

English occultists
English occult writers
Esotericists
1936 births
2003 deaths